Cairnsia is a genus of beetle in the family Cerambycidae. Its sole species is Cairnsia cowleyi. It was described by Blackburn in 1895.

References

Pteropliini
Beetles described in 1895